APT Entertainment, Inc. is a television and film production company in the Philippines.

History

APT Entertainment, Inc. is a subsidiary of TAPE Inc., and the producer of the longest-running noontime variety show, Eat Bulaga!. APT stands for Antonio P. Tuviera, its co-owner and chairman who is also a producer of Eat Bulaga!, along with his business partner Malou Choa-Fagar. APT Entertainment is a partner of GMA Network.

APT Entertainment, Inc. is a content provider for television and a production company for movies and events which has been behind TV series such as Telesine, True Stories and Lenten Specials aired over GMA Network.

APT Studios

APT Studios is a state-of-the-art television studio located at Marcos Highway, Cainta, Rizal, just near the boundary with Marikina, part of Metro Manila. It is currently the home studio of the longest-running noontime variety show in the Philippines, Eat Bulaga!, since its transfer to the studio on December 8, 2018 as part of its year-long celebration of the show's 40th anniversary.

In 2015, a Facebook post became popular as it showed pictures of the on-going construction of a new studio for Eat Bulaga. During that time, the AlDub phenomenon was very popular in the Kalyeserye segment of the noontime show and the demand for a larger audience area increased due to the said phenomena.

On November 23, 2018, a short teaser about the show's transfer to its new studio was aired and posted on the show's social media accounts. It also uploaded several throwback videos on their social media platforms about the history of their former studios like the Broadcast City (1979–1987), Celebrity Sports Plaza (1987–1989, 1994–1995), ABS-CBN Studio 1 (1989–1994) and Broadway Centrum (1995–2018). It was on December 1, 2018, when the hosts officially announced the transfer of the show to its new studio now known as APT Studios.

On December 8, 2018, Eat Bulaga! aired its first live episode from the APT Studios. The opening number was led by the winners of Hype Kang Bata Ka and the hosts of EB!, and it ended with the singing of the Eat Bulaga! theme song, including Senate President Tito Sotto, who usually appeared on the show during occasions. The said transfer of the show to its new studio is one of the highlights of its year-long celebration of its 40th anniversary on television.

Due to the COVID-19 pandemic, the management of Eat Bulaga! decided to suspend the admission of live studio audiences beginning March 9, 2020, this is to ensure the safety of everyone watching the show live in the studio.

Film production

As production company
 Ispiritista: Itay, may moomoo! (2005)
 TxT (2006)
 Shake, Rattle & Roll 8 (2006) – Production company, "LRT" segment
 Shake, Rattle & Roll 9 (2007) – Production company, "Bangungot" segment
 Urduja (2008)
 Dobol Trobol: Lets Get Redi 2 Rambol! (2008)
 Scaregivers (2008)
 Shake Rattle & Roll X (2008) – Production company, "Emergency" segment
 Iskul Bukol 20 Years After: The Ungasis and Escaleras Adventure (2008)
 Fuchsia' (2009)
 Ded na si Lolo (2009)
 Litsonero (2009)
 Agaton & Mindy (2009)
 Kamoteng kahoy (2009)
 Bente (2009)
 Love on Line (LOL) (2009) co-production with OctoArts Films and M-Zet TV Productions, Inc.
 Yaya and Angelina: The Spoiled Brat Movie (2009) Co-production with GMA Films
 Ang Darling Kong Aswang (2009) co-production with OctoArts Films and M-Zet TV Productions, Inc.
 Si Agimat at si Enteng Kabisote (2010) co-production with OctoArts Films, Imus Productions, M-Zet TV Productions, Inc.  and GMA Films
 Pak! Pak! My Dr. Kwak! (2011) co-production with ABS-CBN Film Productions, Inc., OctoArts Films and M-Zet TV Productions, Inc.
 Enteng Ng Ina Mo (2011) co-production with ABS-CBN Film Productions, Inc., OctoArts Films and M-Zet TV Productions, Inc.
 D' Kilabots Pogi Brothers Weh?! (2012) co-production with M-Zet TV Productions, Inc.
 Si Agimat, Si Enteng at Ako (2012) co-production with OctoArts Films, Imus Productions, M-Zet TV Productions, Inc. ang GMA Films
 My Little Bossings (2013) co-production with OctoArts Films,  M-Zet TV Productions, Inc. and K Productions
 The Janitor (2014)
 My Big Bossing (2014) co-production with OctoArts Films and M-Zet TV Productions, Inc.
 Liwanag sa Dilim (2015)
 My Bebe Love: KiligPaMore (2015) co-production with OctoArts Films, M-Zet TV Productions, Inc., GMA Films and MEDA Productions
 Imagine You and Me (2016) co-production with GMA Films and M–Zet TV Production, Inc.
 Enteng Kabisote 10 and the Abangers (2016) co-production with OctoArts Films and M-Zet TV Productions, Inc.
 Die Beautiful (2016) co-production with Hong Kong – Asia Film Financing Forum, TheIdeaFirst Company and October Train Films
 Jack Em Popoy: The Puliscredibles (2018) co-production with CCM Film Productions and M-Zet Productions
 Banal (2019)
Isa Pa with Feelings (2019) co-production with Black Sheep Productions
Cara x Jagger (2019) co-production with Cignal Entertainment
Mission Unstapabol: The Don Identity (2019) co-production with M-Zet Productions

As distributor
 Txt (2006)
 Fuchsia (2009)
 Ded na si Lolo (2009)
 Litsonero (2009)
 Agaton & Mindy (2009)
 Kamoteng kahoy (2009)
 Bente (2009)

As miscellaneous company
 Smith & Wesson (1988) – Filming Facilities
 Iputok Mo...Dadapa Ako! (1990) – Filming Facilities
 Sam & Miguel: Your Basura, No Problema (1992) – Filming Facilities 
 Ang Tange Kong Pag-ibig (1992) – Filming facilities
 Hindi Pa Tapos Ang Labada, Darling! (1994) –  Filming facilities
 GMA Telesine Specials: Sugat ng Inakay (1996) - TV Movie/Line Producer
 Lab en Kisses (1997) – Filming facilities
 Biyudo si Daddy, Biyuda si Mommy (1997) – Filming facilities

Television productions
Currently-produced shows
Aired on GMA Network
 Eat Bulaga! (July 30, 1979 – present)
 Daddy's Gurl (October 13, 2018 – present)

Previously-produced shows
 Betty and the Beast (1994), aired on GMA Network
  (December 5, 2005 – August 6, 2007), aired on QTV
 Ful Haus (August 5, 2007 – August 16, 2009), aired on GMA Network
 Sunday PinaSaya (August 9, 2015 – December 29, 2019), aired on GMA Network
 Carpool (November 26 – December 31, 2020), aired on TV5
 POPinoy (June 13 – November 7, 2021) (as Archangel Media)
 Fill in the Bank (August 15, 2020 – March 30, 2021) (as Archangel Media)
 Bawal Na Game Show (August 16, 2020 – March 31, 2021) (as Archangel Media)
 Chika, Besh! (August 17, 2020 – January 8, 2021) (as Archangel Media')

Holy Week dramas
APT Entertainment Lenten Specials are traditionally aired during Black Saturday on GMA Network.

 Recording artists 
Yara
Ver5us

See also
 Eat Bulaga!''
 Philippine noontime variety television shows

References

Television production companies of the Philippines
Mass media companies established in 1994
1994 establishments in the Philippines